Gregoire Moulin vs. Humanity (original title: Grégoire Moulin contre l'humanité) is a 2001 French comedy film directed by Artus de Penguern.

Cast

 Artus de Penguern : Grégoire Moulin
 Pascale Arbillot : Odile Bonheur
 Élisabeth Vitali : Hélène
 Antoine Duléry : Emmanuel Lacarrière
 Didier Bénureau : Jean-François
 Marie-Armelle Deguy : Solange
 Clovis Cornillac : Jacky
 Philippe Magnan : Jérôme
 Thomas Chabrol : Rodolphe
 Valérie Benguigui : Madame Moulin
 Philippe Hérisson : Monsieur Moulin
 Michel Bompoil : Adolf Hitler
 Patrick Lambert : Benito Mussolini
 Christian Charmetant : Cardinal Richelieu
 Fabrice Bagni : Charles Bovary
 Clara Bagni : Janine
 Anne Caillon : Catherine Lacarrière
 Serge Riaboukine : The taxi driver
 François Levantal : The vindictive
 Dominique Farrugia : The sport reporter
 Jean-Luc Couchard

Accolades

References

External links
 

2000s French-language films
French comedy films
Universal Pictures films
2001 comedy films
2001 films
2000s French films